Areas galactina is a moth of the family Erebidae. It was described by Jan van der Hoeven in 1840. It is found in China (Sichuan, Hunan, Guangdong, Guangxi, Yunnan, Hubei), Taiwan, the north-western Himalayas, India (Sikkim, Assam, Andamans), Nepal, Bhutan, Bangladesh, Indochina, the Philippines, Indonesia and Sundaland.

The length of the forewings is 32–35 mm for males and 40–42 mm for females.

Subspecies
Areas galactina galactina
Areas galactina formosana Okano, 1960 (Taiwan)
Areas galactina hollowayi Dubatolov, Haynes & Kishida, 2009 (Malaysia: Sabah)
Areas galactina inouei Dubatolov, Haynes & Kishida, 2009 (Vietnam)
Areas galactina khasiana Daniel, 1943
Areas galactina latifascia (Rothschild, 1933) (Andamans)
Areas galactina ochracea Mell, 1922 (China: Sichuan, Hunan, Guangdong, Guangxi, Yunnan, Hubei)
Areas galactina orientalis (Walker, 1855) (Assam, Sikkim, Himachal Pradesh, Nepal, Bhutan, Bangladesh)
Areas galactina owadai Dubatolov, Haynes & Kishida, 2009 (Philippines: Palawan, Luzon, Mindoro, Panay, Leyte, Negros)
Areas galactina trigonalis (Snellen van Vollenhoven, 1863) (Malacca, Sumatra, Borneo)

References

 , 2009: Subspecies of Areas galactina (Hoeven, 1840) (Lepidoptera, Arctiidae): 25 years after H. Inoue's review. Tinea 20 (5): 316-329.
 , 1840: Beschrijving eeniger nieuwe of weining bekende uitlandsche soorten van Lepidoptera. Tijdschrift voor Natuurlijke Geschiedenis en Physiologie 7: 276-283, pl. 5-7, S. en J. Luchtmans: Leiden.
 , 1938: Ueber Indomalayische Nachfalter (Lep. Heteroc.). V. Entomologische Zeitschrift 52: 157-160, Frankfurt am Main.

Spilosomina
Moths of Asia
Lepidoptera of Nepal
Fauna of the Himalayas
Fauna of Tibet
Moths described in 1840